Fedor Sapon (born 18 March 1993) is a Belarusian footballer. As of 2020, he plays for Granit Mikashevichi.

References

External links

Profile at FC Minsk website

1993 births
Living people
Belarusian footballers
Association football forwards
FC Minsk players
FC Bereza-2010 players
FC Torpedo Minsk players
FC Smorgon players
FC Granit Mikashevichi players